The La France M16K is an M16 rifle modified by the company La France Specialties, which among with other firearm-related activities, convert common military weapons into more compact configurations typically for law enforcement and special forces use.

The M16K was designed by Timothy F. La France, the principal of La France Specialties, formerly of San Diego, California, for use by persons anticipating ambush while in transit. Its short length and unique sighting system was designed to facilitate firing from moving vehicles, where the extra length of even a CAR-15 or XM-177 might create a problem. Its extremely compact envelope also makes it an ideal weapon for helicopter crews, who otherwise would be forced to rely on sidearms for protection in the event of a forced landing.

Design
The M16K is a so-called "K" weapon ("K" standing for the German word Kurz meaning short). The La France M16K was basically a standard military M16 rifle chambered for the  5.56 mm cartridge, but modified with an 8 3/8 inch (213 mm) barrel. Like many automatic and semi-automatic weapons the M16 utilizes pressure from the propellant gases in the barrel to cycle the bolt of the firearm. Most automatic weapons use a mechanical device such as a rod and piston between the bolt and the propellant gases. This is not the case in the M16 design in which gases are tapped off the barrel near the muzzle and flow through a tube to directly impinge on the bolt to initiate the auto loading cycle. In a standard issue M16, the gas tube is roughly 16 inches (406 mm) long to produce an automatic (cyclic) rate of fire of approximately 650 rounds per minute. Shortening the barrel increases the rate of fire significantly and thereby makes the weapon difficult to control and less reliable. To use a significantly shorter barrel than the standard issue without increasing the rate of fire, La France designed (and subsequently patented) an adjustable gas system that would keep the rate of fire the same as with a full-length barrel.

History
The M16K was produced by La France beginning in 1982, subsequently a highly modified variation of this gun was developed which was designated the M16K-45 which was chambered for the .45 ACP round and utilizing 20- or 30-round Thompson submachine gun magazines. Except for the magazines this firearm was entirely manufactured by La France and not just a modification of an existing firearm as was case with the original M16K. In the 1990s agreement was entered into between La France Specialties and NAIT to distribute La France Specialty products. La France Specialties was acquired by SureFire, LLC in 2004, and all La France products are still available.

The M16K uses the early Colt AR-15 upper receiver, and therefore lacks the forward assist and shell deflector found on A1 and later upper receivers. The rear sight consists of a metal tube welded onto the carrying handle in place of the original adjustable sight, creating a quasi-ghost ring sight. The handguards are shortened versions of the original triangular handguards. M16Ks make use of the stainless steel twin-tube La France gas system, which greatly increases reliability using the short barrel. The lower receiver is a standard M16 select fire unit. M16Ks are quite rare and very collectible.

The later M16K-45 variant was produced using proprietary upper and lower receivers designed by Timothy F. La France specifically for the .45 ACP round. Both are forgings. The M16K-45 was produced in both a fully automatic Title II version with a short barrel and a semi-automatic version fitted with a 16" barrel to allow it to be sold as a Title I firearm. The barrels are compensated to reduce muzzle climb in fully automatic fire. Production delays resulted in the semi-automatic version not being ready for civilian sales until after enactment of the Federal Assault Weapons Ban in 1994, which impaired sales. When the Federal Assault Weapons Ban lapsed, M16K-45s again became legal for sale.

Fully automatic and semi-automatic versions of the M16K-45 may be obtained from North American Integrated Technologies (NAIT) in Texas, which provided the funding for development, testing and production of the M16K-45 variant. The fully automatic versions are post-May 1986 machine guns, and may only be transferred to available to persons and agencies permitted to have post-May 1986 machine guns under the National Firearms Act. The semi-automatic versions are available for civilian purchase to qualified buyers.

Accessories
The LaFrance M4 HFZ Suppressor unit is designed to work with short-barreled rifles like the LaFrance M16K for use in semi-automatic as well as full-automatic fire mode.
Caliber: 5.56×45mm NATO.
Recommended Cartridges: M193 Ball (M16A1 Rifle or XM177 Carbine) or M855 Ball (M16A2/M16A3 Rifle, M16A4 Rifle, or M4/M4A1 Carbine).
Sound level (w/suppressor attached): 113 dB with silenced M855 ball
Sound level(w/o suppressor): 168 dB unsilenced M855 ball
Finish: Baked flat black enamel over a manganese phosphate coating.
Construction: 4130 steel tube with 7075T6 and 303ss internals.
Mounting: Screws onto threaded muzzle-cap.
Length of suppressor: 12 inches.
Diameter of suppressor: 1.875 inches.
Length (Overall):  +11.5 inches to weapon length.
Muzzle flash: None.
Weight of suppressor: 36 oz.

Carbines
Submachine guns
ArmaLite AR-10 derivatives